McGautha v. California, 402 U.S. 183 (1971), is a criminal case heard by the United States Supreme Court, in which the Court held that the lack of legal standards by which juries imposed the death penalty was not an unconstitutional violation of the due process clause portions of the Fourteenth Amendment. Justice Harlan wrote that writing rules for jury death penalty decisions was beyond current human ability. The context was public and philosophical scrutiny of the unequal application of the death penalty, especially in that blacks who killed whites were much more likely to have a death penalty imposed. McGautha was superseded one year later by Furman v. Georgia.

References

External links
 

United States Supreme Court cases
Cruel and Unusual Punishment Clause and death penalty case law
Capital punishment in California
1971 in United States case law
1971 in California
Legal history of California
United States Supreme Court cases of the Burger Court